The 2007 Ivan Hlinka Memorial Tournament was an ice hockey tournament held in Hodonin, Czech Republic and Piešťany, Slovakia between August 14, 2007 and August 18, 2007. It was the 2007 installment of the Ivan Hlinka Memorial Tournament. Sweden defeated Finland 3-2 in the final to claim the gold medal, while Russia defeated Canada 5-4 to capture the bronze medal.

Challenge results

Preliminary round

Group A

Group B

Final round
Schedule
All times local (UTC +1)

Seventh place game

Fifth place game

Bronze medal game

Gold medal game

Final standings

External links
Results from Swehockey.se THE SWEDISH ICE HOCKEY ASSOCIATION

Ivan Hlinka Memorial Tournament, 2007
2007
International ice hockey competitions hosted by Slovakia
International ice hockey competitions hosted by the Czech Republic
Ivan
2006–07 in Slovak ice hockey